Aadil Masud Ali (born 29 December 1994) is an English cricketer who played for Leicestershire County Cricket Club. He is a right-handed batsman who bowls right-arm off spin. He made his list A debut for Leicestershire against the touring New Zealanders in June 2015.

References

External links
 

1994 births
Living people
English cricketers
Leicestershire cricketers
British Asian cricketers
Cricketers from Leicester
English cricketers of the 21st century